The so-called Vatican Mythographers are the anonymous authors of three Latin mythographical texts found together in a single medieval manuscript, Vatican Reg. lat. 1401.  The name is that used by Angelo Mai when he published the first edition of the works in 1831.  The text of the First Vatican Mythographer is found only in the Vatican manuscript; the second and third texts are found separately in other manuscripts, leading scholars to refer to a Second Vatican Mythographer and a Third Vatican Mythographer.

Content 
Taken together, the works of the Vatican Mythographers provided a source-book of Greek and Roman myths and their iconography throughout the Middle Ages and the Renaissance. The texts, which were being copied in manuscripts as late as the 15th century,  were parsed allegorically to provide Christianized moral and theological implications, "until in time the pagan divinities blossomed into full-fledged vices and virtues". Their testimonia, sources, and parallel passages constitute central documents in the transmission of classical culture to the medieval world, which is a major theme in the history of ideas in the West—though the texts have also been described as "highly deceptive sources which should be used with much caution".

Mai made many slips in rapidly transcribing the manuscript under difficult conditions, and he was in the habit of substituting euphemisms where the original was too sexually explicit to transcribe and publish, even in Latin. A revised, indexed edition of 1834, corrected by Georg Heinrich Bode without access to the Vatican manuscript, is the version that replaced Mai's first edition and has been drawn on in popular 20th-century anthologies of Greek mythology, such as those by Edith Hamilton, Robert Graves, and Karl Kerenyi.

The work of the First Vatican Mythographer is essentially a pared-down "fact-book" of mythology, stripped of nuance, not unlike the Fabulae of Hyginus, who, however, had provided no Roman stories and so could not suffice. No classical authors are quoted directly, but the author seems to have used the commentary on Virgil by Servius and the scholiasts on Statius as sources. A modern edition of the text was published in 1995 by Nevio Zorzetti. On the basis of the latest source cited in it and the date of the first source to cite it, Zorzetti dates the composition of the work between the last quarter of the 9th century and the third quarter of the 11th century.

Ten manuscripts are known for the second text, and more than forty for the third. The work of the Second Vatican Mythographer, which draws on that of the first, though it is considerably longer, perhaps dates to the 11th century. A modern edition of it was produced by Péter Kulcsár in 1987. The work of the Third Vatican Mythographer, which differs from the others by containing "extensive allegorical interpretations", has often been attributed either to a certain Alberic of London, who is named in a number of the manuscripts, or to Alexander Neckam.

Notes

References
Burnett, Charles S. F. "A Note on the Origins of the Third Vatican Mythographer", Journal of the Warburg and Courtauld Institutes 44 (1981), pp. 160–166.
Elliott, Kathleen O., and J. P. Elder. "A Critical Edition of the Vatican Mythographers", Transactions and Proceedings of the American Philological Association 78 (1947), pp. 189–207. (Summarizes results of research for an edition that never materialized.)
Kulcsár, Péter. Mythographi Vaticani I et II. Corpus Christianorum Series Latina 91c. Turnhout: Brepols, 1987. 
Pepin, Ronald E. The Vatican Mythographers.  New York: Fordham University Press, 2008.  (English translation of all three texts.)
Zorzetti, Nevio, and Jacques Berlioz. Le Premier mythographe du Vatican. Collection des universités de France, Série latine. Paris: Les Belles Lettres, 1995.  (Includes a French translation [by Berlioz] and extensive annotations.)

Mythographers
Medieval Latin-language writers
Manuscripts of the Vatican Library
Works of unknown authorship
References on Greek mythology